Eugène Philippe LaRocque (27 March 1927 – 16 December 2018) was a Canadian Catholic priest, and Bishop of Alexandria-Cornwall from 1974 to 2002. 

LaRocque served as State Chaplain for the Knights of Columbus in Ontario from 1977 to 1987, and President of Assembly of Catholic Bishops of Ontario from 1993 to 1997.

References

1927 births
2018 deaths
20th-century Roman Catholic bishops in Canada
21st-century Roman Catholic bishops in Canada
People from Windsor, Ontario
Roman Catholic bishops of Alexandria–Cornwall